ξ Oph, Latinized as Xi Ophiuchi, is a visual binary star system in the equatorial constellation of Ophiuchus. It has a yellow-white hue and is faintly visible to the naked eye with a combined apparent visual magnitude of 4.39. The system is located approximately 56.6 light years away from the Sun based on parallax, but is drifting closer with a radial velocity of -9 km/s.

The magnitude 4.40 primary, designated component A, is an ordinary F-type main-sequence star with a stellar classification of F2V. It is 916 million years old and is rotating with a projected rotational velocity of 20 km/s. The star has 1.3 times the mass of the Sun and 1.6 times the Sun's radius. It is radiating 4.4 times the luminosity of the Sun from its photosphere at an effective temperature of 6,611 K.

The system is a source of X-ray emission. The orbiting companion, component B, is a magnitude 8.9 star at an angular separation of  along a position angle of 27° from the primary, as of 2015.

References

F-type main-sequence stars
Binary stars

Ophiuchus (constellation)
Ophiuchi, Xi
BD-20 4731
Ophiuchi, 40
0670
156897
084893
6445